AVS: Science and Technology of Materials, Interfaces, and Processing (formerly American Vacuum Society) is a not-for-profit learned society founded in 1953 focused on disciplines related to materials, interfaces, and processing. AVS has approximately 4500 members worldwide from academia, governmental laboratories and industry.

AVS is a member society of the American Institute of Physics.  AVS publishes through the American Institute of Physics the
journals Journal of Vacuum Science and Technology (JVST A and B) and Biointerphases, which are devoted to peer-reviewed articles, and Surface Science Spectra (SSS), which publishes peer-reviewed articles with reference spectra of technological and scientific interest. In 2019  American Institute of Physics and AVS launched jointly a new journal AVS Quantum Science.

Organization

AVS is composed of 10 technical divisions, two technical groups, 16 regional chapters, two international chapters and one international affiliate:

Advanced Surface Engineering Division
Applied Surface Science Division
Biomaterial Interfaces Division
Electronic Materials/Photonics Division
Magnetic Interfaces and Nanostructures Division
Nanometer-Scale Science and Technology Division
Plasma Science and Technology Division
Surface Science Division
Thin Film Division (TF)
Vacuum Technology Division

AVS Technical Groups Division
Manufacturing Science & Technology Technical Group (MSTG)
MEMS and NEMS Technical Group

Conferences

The AVS International Symposium and Exhibition is AVS's flagship conference. The symposium addresses cutting-edge issues associated
with materials, processing, and interfaces in the research and manufacturing communities. AVS also sponsors a variety of topical conferences, including the International Conference on Atomic Layer Deposition and the North American Conference on Molecular Beam Epitaxy.

AVS professional awards
 Dorothy Hoffman Award
Medard W. Welch Award
 John A. Thornton Memorial Award & Lecture

AVS graduate student awards
 Russell and Sigurd Varian Award
 Dorothy M. and Earl S. Hoffman Award
 Nellie Yeoh Whetten Award
 Dorothy M. and Earl S. Hoffman Scholarship
 Graduate Research Award (GRA)

References

External links
AVS web site

Organizations established in 1953
Physics organizations
Academic organizations based in the United States
1953 establishments in the United States
Organizations based in New York (state)